Gömür or Gyumyur” or Gemyur or Gëmyur may refer to:
Gömür, Davachi, Azerbaijan
Gömür, Nakhchivan, Azerbaijan